Renée Elise Goldsberry (born January 2, 1971) is an American actress and singer known for originating the role of Angelica Schuyler in the Broadway musical Hamilton, for which she won the 2016 Tony Award for Best Featured Actress in a Musical. Her other Broadway credits include Nettie Harris in the original Broadway cast of The Color Purple, and Mimi Marquez in Rent.  She has portrayed many roles on television, including Geneva Pine on The Good Wife, and Evangeline Williamson on One Life to Live, for which she received two Daytime Emmy Award nominations for Outstanding Supporting Actress in a Drama Series. As of 2021, she stars in the Peacock musical comedy Girls5eva. Also that year, she received a nomination for a Primetime Emmy Award for Outstanding Actress in a Supporting Role in a Limited Series or Movie for her performance in the Disney+ live stage recording of Hamilton, which was released in 2020.

Early life and education 
Goldsberry was born in San Jose, California and raised in both Houston, Texas and Detroit, Michigan. She is the daughter of Betty Sanders, an industrial psychologist, and her father was an automotive industry executive in Michigan. Goldsberry has one older brother and two younger brothers. Goldsberry was introduced to theater in summer camp when she was 8 years old. Renée's younger brother was shy, and their mother enrolled both of them in camp at the HITS Theater in Houston taught by Carolyn Franklin.

After graduating from Cranbrook Kingswood School in Bloomfield Hills, Michigan, she attended Carnegie Mellon University, where she graduated with a Bachelor of Fine Arts in theater, in 1993. This is also where she became a member of Delta Sigma Theta sorority through the Theta Beta chapter. She subsequently attended graduate school at the University of Southern California's Thornton School of Music, where she received a Master of Music in jazz studies, graduating in 1997.

Career

Television 
Between 1997 and 2002, Goldsberry had a recurring role on the Fox legal comedy-drama Ally McBeal, as one of the back-up singers who frequently accompanied Vonda Shepard's performances. She appeared in a total of 43 episodes prior to the series' cancellation. Goldsberry also carried the role over into a three-episode guest appearance on the spin-off series Ally.

Goldsberry portrayed attorney Evangeline Williamson on the ABC soap opera One Life to Live from 2003 until 2007. She was nominated for an NAACP Image Award in 2004 for Outstanding Actress in a Daytime Drama Series, and won a Soap Opera Digest Award in 2005 with co-stars Michael Easton and Melissa Archer. Goldsberry was nominated for the Daytime Emmy Award for Outstanding Supporting Actress in a Drama Series in both 2006 and 2007 for the role. After she left One Life to Live, Goldsberry held a recurring role as assistant state attorney Geneva Pine on the CBS political drama The Good Wife, appearing multiple times every season throughout its run. She ultimately appeared in 23 episodes between 2010 and the series' end in 2016. Goldsberry has also made guest appearances on series such as Evil (2019 TV series from the same creators of The Good Wife), Star Trek: Enterprise, Royal Pains, Law & Order: Special Victims Unit, Younger, Masters of Sex, and That '80s Show.

In 2017, Goldsberry starred as Henrietta Lacks in the HBO television film adaptation of Rebecca Skloot's nonfiction work, The Immortal Life of Henrietta Lacks. In 2018, she appeared in the Netflix science fiction series Altered Carbon as Quellcrist Falconer, and reprised the role in season 2. She also performed the Johnny Cash song "Ain't No Grave" for the end credits to the final episode. Goldsberry currently stars on Girls5eva in the role of Wickie Roy, a member of a one-hit wonder 1990s girl band group Girls5eva. Girls5eva chronicles their reunion and attempts to reignite their stardom. The series premiered on May 6, 2021, on the Peacock streaming service.

Film 
In 2001, Goldsberry had the lead role of Nicole Taylor in the romantic comedy All About You, for which her performance was praised. She also portrayed Drea Smalls in the 2008 action film Pistol Whipped, and small supporting roles as Cynthia Barnes in the crime drama Every Secret Thing (2014) and Kim in the comedy Sisters (2015). In 2019 she starred in Waves (2019) with co-star Sterling K. Brown.

Theatre 

Goldsberry played a replacement Nala in the Broadway production of The Lion King, and was in the cast of the United States national tour of Dreamgirls.

She was nominated for a Drama League Award for Distinguished Performance, and won a New York magazine Best of 2005 Award, for her performance as Sylvia in the 2005 Shakespeare in the Park revival of Two Gentlemen of Verona. Goldsberry later originated the role of Nettie Harris in The Color Purple, the Broadway musical adaptation of the Pulitzer Prize-winning 1982 novel of the same name. She starred in the production from November 2005 to January 2006.

Goldsberry returned to the Off-Broadway stage in The Baker's Wife in 2007, before taking over the role of Mimi Márquez in the Broadway musical Rent, making her the final actress to play the role on Broadway. Rent last performance was filmed and made into a DVD, Rent: Filmed Live on Broadway, which also aired as a television film. In 2011, she was nominated for an Outer Critics Circle Award for her portrayal of Kate Dillon in the Broadway production of David Lindsay-Abaire's play Good People. She went on to appear in off-Broadway productions of Love's Labour's Lost and As You Like It, and appeared in I'm Getting My Act Together and Taking It on the Road at Encores!.

Goldsberry originated the role of Angelica Schuyler in Hamilton, playing her last performance in the role on September 3, 2016. For her work in the production, she won a 2015 Drama Desk Award, the Lucille Lortel Award for Outstanding Featured Actress in a Musical, and the 2016 Tony Award for Best Featured Actress in a Musical. In addition, as a member of the principal cast, she also received a Grammy Award after the original cast album won Best Musical Theater Album at the 2016 Grammy Awards.

Music 
Goldsberry has had a lengthy singing and songwriting career, co-writing and performing more than half the soundtrack to the 2001 film All About You, including the title song. She was also the grand prize winner of the 1997 John Lennon Songwriting Contest for her rock music. Goldsberry wrote and recorded an album titled Everything But the Kitchen Sink (2001) and an EP titled Beautiful (2006).

In October 2015, she appeared at the BET Hip Hop Awards, where she was one of two women to rap in the Cypher.

Personal life 
In 2002, Goldsberry married New York attorney Alexis Johnson. In May 2009, she gave birth to their first child, a son named Benjamin Johnson. In 2014, she and her husband adopted a second child, a daughter from Africa named Brielle.

Filmography

Film

Television

Stage

Discography 
 Everything But the Kitchen Sink (2001, out of print)
 A Holiday Affair (2006, sings "The Christmas Song")
 Beautiful (2006, EP; out of print)
 The Color Purple (2006, original Broadway cast recording)
 Hamilton (2015, original Broadway cast recording)
 Original Cast Album: Co-Op (2019, Lakeshore Records) 
 Zoey's Extraordinary Playlist (2020, Season 1 Soundtrack)
 Girls5eva (2021, soundtrack)

Awards and nominations

References

External links 

 
 
 

1971 births
21st-century American actresses
Actresses from Detroit
Actresses from Houston
African-American actresses
American film actresses
American musical theatre actresses
American soap opera actresses
American stage actresses
American television actresses
Carnegie Mellon University College of Fine Arts alumni
Cranbrook Educational Community alumni
Drama Desk Award winners
Grammy Award winners
Living people
USC Thornton School of Music alumni
Tony Award winners
21st-century African-American singers
21st-century African-American women singers
21st-century American singers